Harvard Vanguard Medical Associates is an American non-profit multi-specialty group medical practice operating in eastern Massachusetts. It was founded in the late 1960s as part of Harvard Community Health Plan (now Harvard Pilgrim Health Care). The two organizations split in 2001. It is allied with five other regional practices as Atrius Health.

References

External links
 

Healthcare in Massachusetts
Medical and health organizations based in Massachusetts